Poo is a word commonly used in everyday language for feces.

Poo may also refer to:

Places
 Poo, Himachal Pradesh, India, a small town
 Poo (Cabrales), a parish in Cabrales, Asturias, Spain
 POO, the IATA code for Poços de Caldas Airport, Brazil
 POO, the National Rail alpha code for Poole railway station

Arts and entertainment
 Poo (film), a Tamil film
 Doctor Poo (radio series), Australian radio serial from 1979 to 1981
 Doctor Poo, cartoon character in the British comic magazine Viz
 Poo, a character in the video game EarthBound
 Masabumi Kikuchi (1939-2015), Japanese jazz pianist and composer nicknamed Poo Sun

Other uses
 Poo (surname)
 No poo, a movement not to use shampoo
 poo, ISO 639-3 code for the Central Pomo language of northern California, United States
 Polonium monoxide (PoO), a chemical compound
 Poo Pathi, a primary worship center and holy place of Ayyavazhi
 The Public Order Ordinance, frequently abbreviated to POO

See also 
 Po (disambiguation)
 Poo poo (disambiguation)
 Pooh (disambiguation) 
 Poop (disambiguation)
 Poos (surname)
 Pugh, a surname